Gaston, Prince of Viana, also called Gaston de Foix (1445 – 23 November 1470), was the son of Gaston IV of Foix and Queen Eleanor of Navarre, and was the heir of both. As Crown Prince of Navarre, he was called Prince of Viana.

He married Magdalena of Valois, a daughter of Charles VII of France and Marie of Anjou on 7 March 1461 at Lescar. They had two children:

 Francis I of Navarre, 1467–1483, King of Navarre 1479–1483
 Catherine I of Navarre, 1470–1517, Queen-regnant of Navarre 1483–1517

Gaston died in 1470 from wounds received in a jousting tournament in Libourne, Aquitaine, before his accession to the throne of Navarre. Consequently, Francis I and Catherine I rose to the throne successively, but it was Gaston's wife Magdalena who actually pulled the strings of the crown all the way to Catherine's marriage to John III of Albret in 1494, and her death in 1495.

References

Sources

1444 births
1470 deaths
Heirs apparent who never acceded
House of Foix
Navarrese infantes
People from Libourne
Foix, Gaston of
Sons of monarchs